The Taipei Metro Neihu station is located in the Neihu District in Taipei, Taiwan. It is a station on Wenhu line.

Station overview

This two-level, elevated station features two side platforms, two exits, and platform elevators located on the north and south sides of the concourse level.

History
22 February 2009: Neihu station construction is completed.
4 July 2009: Begins service with the opening of Brown Line.

Station layout

Around the station
Lake Square
Qingbai Park
Huguang Open-air Market
American Institute in Taiwan (new planned location)
Bihu Elementary School
Kangning Elementary School
Jinbi Temple

References

Wenhu line stations
Railway stations opened in 2009